The York Medieval Press is a publishing joint venture between the University of York Centre for Medieval Studies and Boydell & Brewer. The venture specialises in interdisciplinary study that aims to bring a fresh approach to medieval culture. The general editor of the press is professor Peter Biller.

Selected titles
Abortion in the Early Middle Ages, c.500-900. Zubin Mistry. 
The Age of Edward III. Edited by J.S. Bothwell. 
The Anglo-Norman Language and its Contexts. Edited by Richard Ingham. 
Brothers and Sisters in Medieval European Literature. Carolyne Larrington. 
Cistercians, Heresy and Crusade in Occitania, 1145-1229, Preaching in the Lord's Vineyard. Beverly Mayne Kienzle. 
Creating the Monastic Past in Medieval Flanders. Karine Ugé.

References 

Publishing companies of the United Kingdom
University of York